Lords of the New Church may refer to:

The Lords of the New Church, a 1980s Gothic rock band
The Lords of the New Church (album), 1982
"Lords of the New Church" (song), a 1993 song by Tasmin Archer